Dendrobium cuthbertsonii is a species of orchid in the genus Dendrobium. It is targeted by commercial collectors who harvest it for export. It has one of the longest floral durations of any orchid, with individual flowers remaining open for up to nine months. Another source says ten months.

References

External links 

cuthbertsonii
Orchids of New Guinea
Flora of the Bismarck Archipelago
Plants described in 1888